Alonzo Church Croom (December 1, 1845 – February 7, 1912) was an American politician who served as Comptroller of Florida from 1901 until 1912.

His father, George Alexander Croom, owned the Casa de Laga Plantation in Tallahassee, and his mother was the daughter of University of Georgia president Alonzo Church for whom he was named. He was born near Quincy, Florida. Hardy Bryan Croom was his older brother.

He married Maria Bond on April 26, 1870. They had children.

He died February 7, 1912, in Ocala, Florida, and was survived by his wife, son, and daughter.

References

External links

1845 births
1912 deaths
20th-century American politicians
People from Quincy, Florida
Florida Democrats
Florida Comptrollers